Thomas Clinton (1918–1981) was a businessman and religious leader.

Thomas Clinton may also refer to:

Thomas Clinton (MP) (died 1415), in 1404 MP for Kent
Thomas Clinton (MP for St. Ives), in 1571 MP for St Ives
Thomas Clinton, 3rd Earl of Lincoln (1568–1619), English peer
Tommy Clinton (1926–2009), footballer
Thomas Clinton, 8th Baron Clinton, Baron Clinton

See also
 Thomas Pelham-Clinton, 3rd Duke of Newcastle (1752–1795), British Army officer and politician